Komo Department is a department of Estuaire Province in western Gabon. The capital lies at Kango. The department had a population of 17,575 in 2013.

Towns and villages
 

Zoulameyong

References

Estuaire Province
Departments of Gabon